The following units and commanders fought in the Battle of Wyse Fork. The Union order of battle is listed separately.

Abbreviations used

Military Rank
 Gen = General
 LTG = Lieutenant General
 MG = Major General
 BG = Brigadier General
 Col = Colonel
 Ltc = Lieutenant Colonel
 Maj = Major
 Cpt = Captain
 Lt = Lieutenant

Other
 (w) = wounded
 (mw) = mortally wounded
 (k) = killed in action
 (c) = captured

Department of North Carolina
Gen Braxton Bragg

Hoke's Division

Contingent from Army of Tennessee
MG Daniel Harvey Hill

Sources
 Hughes, Jr. Nathaniel Cheairs. Bentonville: The Final Battle of Sherman and Johnston. University of North Carolina Press, 1996. 
 Historical Preservation Group website

American Civil War orders of battle